Breithaupt is the surname of:
 August Breithaupt (1791–1873), German mineralogist
 Jim Breithaupt, Canadian politician
 Louis Breithaupt (tanner) (1827–1880), German-born tanner and politician in Ontario, Canada
 Louis Jacob Breithaupt (1855–1939), manufacturer and politician in Ontario, Canada
 Louis Orville Breithaupt (1890–1960), politician and Lieutenant Governor of Ontario
 Scot Breithaupt, American entrepreneur

The name may also refer to:
 Breithaupt v. Abram, a 1957 case in which the Supreme Court of the United States held that in some circumstances, involuntary blood samples may be used as evidence in criminal prosecutions